"Feel the Love" is a song by British drum and bass band Rudimental. It features the vocals from John Newman. It is the second single from their debut studio album, Home. The song was released in the United Kingdom on 14 May 2012 and went on to debut at the summit on the UK Singles and Dance Charts. The track was selected as BBC Radio 1 DJ Zane Lowe's Hottest Record in the World on 29 March 2012.

"Feel the Love" was featured in the 2012 video game Need for Speed: Most Wanted and in a 2013 promotional advertising for Foxtel in Australia. The song has also been used the promo of The Pauly D Project and Doctor Who, as well as in the 2015 film Kingsman: The Secret Service.

Music video
A music video to accompany the release of "Feel the Love" was first released onto YouTube on 12 April 2012. It was filmed in Philadelphia, Pennsylvania and features young horseback riders and neighborhood scenes from the informal Fletcher Street Urban Riding Club, a longtime homegrown community-based program for youth. As of January 2022, it has been viewed over 100 million times.

Chart performance
In the United Kingdom, "Feel the Love" debuted at number-one on the UK Singles Chart on the week ending 9 June 2012 selling 93,841 copies and becoming both Rudimental and Newman's first number one in the UK. The feat also gave Asylum Records its first number-one single in its 41-year history. On its second week, the track fell three places to number four having sold an additional 51,974 copies. The song spent eleven consecutive weeks within the UK top 10, falling nine places to number sixteen on its twelfth charting week. The song sold 619,000 copies in 2012, making it the 16th best-selling single of the year.

For the chart week dated 1 July 2012, "Feel the Love" debuted at number 42 on the Australian Singles Chart, advancing 30 places to number 12 the following week. Having climbed a further six places on its third charting week, the track reached a peak of number three on the chart week dated 15 July 2012 and has since been certified 2× Platinum by the Australian Recording Industry Association.

Track listings

Charts and certifications

Weekly charts

Year-end charts

Certifications

|-

Release history

References

2012 singles
2012 songs
John Newman (singer) songs
Rudimental songs
Asylum Records singles
Atlantic Records singles
Black Butter Records singles
Number-one singles in Scotland
Song recordings produced by Rudimental
Songs written by Amir Amor
Songs written by John Newman (singer)
UK Singles Chart number-one singles